The 75th Academy Awards ceremony, presented by the Academy of Motion Picture Arts and Sciences (AMPAS) took place on March 23, 2003, at the Kodak Theatre in Hollywood, Los Angeles. During the ceremony, AMPAS presented Academy Awards (commonly referred to as Oscars) in 24 categories honoring films released in 2002. The ceremony, televised in the United States by ABC, was produced by Gilbert Cates and was directed by Louis J. Horvitz. Actor Steve Martin hosted for the second time, having previously presided over the 73rd ceremony held in 2001. Three weeks earlier in a ceremony at Regent Beverly Wilshire Hotel in Beverly Hills, California held on March 1, the Academy Awards for Technical Achievement were presented by host Kate Hudson.

Chicago won six awards, including Best Picture. Other winners included The Pianist with three awards, Frida and The Lord of the Rings: The Two Towers with two, and 8 Mile, Adaptation, Bowling for Columbine, The ChubbChubbs!, The Hours, Nowhere in Africa, Road to Perdition, Spirited Away, Talk to Her, This Charming Man, and Twin Towers with one. The telecast garnered about 33 million viewers in the United States, making it the least-watched and lowest-rated televised Oscar ceremony to that point.

Winners and nominees 

The nominees for the 75th Academy Awards were announced on February 11, 2003, at the Samuel Goldwyn Theater in Beverly Hills, California, by Frank Pierson, president of the Academy, and Academy Award winning-actress Marisa Tomei. Chicago received the most nominations with thirteen. It was the eighth film to receive that many nominations. Gangs of New York came in second with ten.

The winners were announced during the awards ceremony on March 23, 2003. Chicago became the first musical film to win Best Picture since 1968's Oliver! At age 29, Adrien Brody was the youngest person to win Best Actor. With her 13th nomination, Meryl Streep became the most nominated actor in Oscar history. Meanwhile, Best Actor nominee Jack Nicholson earned his 12th nomination, extending his record as the most nominated male performer. Julianne Moore was the ninth performer to earn two acting nominations in the same year. "Lose Yourself" from 8 Mile became the first hip hop song to win the Best Original Song award.

Awards

Winners are listed first, highlighted in boldface, and indicated with a double dagger.

Academy Honorary Award
Peter O'Toole  whose remarkable talents have provided cinema history with some of its most memorable characters.

Films with multiple nominations and awards

Presenters and performers
The following individuals presented awards or performed musical numbers.

Presenters

Performers

Meeting of Oscar-winning interpreters 
To celebrate the 75th anniversary of the Academy Awards, a family photo was taken in which the Academy gathered as many Oscar-winning actors and actresses as possible, which was preceded by an introduction by an Olivia de Havilland who reflected on the changes produced in society since he won the statuette, except in one of the areas: the love of cinema.

The award-winning actors who attended the event were: Julie Andrews, Kathy Bates, Halle Berry, Ernest Borgnine, Adrien Brody, Red Buttons, Nicolas Cage, Michael Caine, George Chakiris, Jennifer Connelly, Sean Connery, Chris Cooper, Geena Davis , Daniel Day-Lewis, Olivia de Havilland, Kirk Douglas, Michael Douglas, Robert Duvall, Louise Fletcher,  Brenda Fricker, Cuba Gooding Jr., Louis Gossett, Jr., Joel Grey, Tom Hanks, Marcia Gay Harden, Dustin Hoffman , Celeste Holm, Anjelica Huston, Claude Jarman Jr., Jennifer Jones, Shirley Jones, George Kennedy, Nicole Kidman, Ben Kingsley, Martin Landau, Cloris Leachman, Karl Malden, Marlee Matlin, Hayley Mills, Rita Moreno , Patricia Neal, Jack Nicholson, Margaret O'Brien, Tatum O'Neal, Jack Palance, Luise Rainer, Julia Roberts, Cliff Robertson, Mickey Rooney, Susan Sarandon, Maximilian Schell, Mira Sorvino, Sissy Spacek, Mary Steenburgen, Meryl Streep , Barbra Streisand, Hilary Swank, Jon Voight, Denzel Washington, Christopher Walken, Teresa Wright and Catherine Zeta-Jones.

Ceremony information

In November 2002, the Academy hired veteran Oscar telecast producer Gilbert Cates to oversee the telecast for the eleventh time. "With ten shows under his belt, no other living producer even comes close to the depth of his experience," said AMPAS president Frank Pierson in a press release announcing the selection. "Gil practically invented the awards show as a stylistic genre. We're privileged to have him present a very special event to celebrate the 75th anniversary of the Oscars." A few days later, actor and comedian Steve Martin was chosen to emcee the upcoming telecast. Cates explained his reason to bring back the veteran comedian saying, "A host who's witty, clever, sharp, intelligent, quick on his feet and always on top of the unfolding action. Wait, I've forgotten something. Oh yeah, and outrageously funny." According to the article published in the Los Angeles Times, Cates approached actor and veteran Oscar host Billy Crystal for emceeing duties. However, as time passed and Crystal was still undecided regarding the job, Cates offered the hosting role to Martin. In a statement, Martin expressed that he was honored to be selected to emcee the telecast joking, "I'm very pleased to be hosting the Oscars again, because fear and nausea always make me lose weight." In addition, this was the first Oscar ceremony broadcast in high-definition.

The ceremony took place on March 23, 2003, at the Kodak Theatre in Hollywood, Los Angeles beginning at 5:30 p.m. PST / 8:30 p.m. EST. To commemorate the 75th anniversary of the Academy Awards, 59 actors who have received both competitive and honorary awards appeared seated onstage together during a segment called Oscar's Family Album. Each former winner was acknowledged by announcer Neil Ross and Randy Thomas with the films he or she won for. At the end of the segment newly minted winners Adrien Brody, Chris Cooper, Nicole Kidman, and Catherine Zeta-Jones, along with Honorary Oscar recipient Peter O'Toole, joined them.

Furthermore, the American-led invasion of Iraq affected the telecast and its surrounding events. Hours after news that the war had commenced several actors such as Cate Blanchett, Jim Carrey, and Will Smith resigned from their roles as presenters citing safety concerns and respect for military families. Despite pleas from broadcaster ABC to postpone the proceedings up to a week, AMPAS president Pierson and ceremony producer Cates refused to delay the gala to a different date citing unavailability of the Kodak Theatre during that time. Pierson also stated that moving the festivities to a different venue would be too expensive for the Academy. However, they also announced that the red carpet festivities would be severely curtailed. The bleacher seats situated along Hollywood Boulevard would also be dismantled, and ticket holders for those seats would receive rain checks that were good toward next year's event. Periodically during commercial breaks, ABC News anchor and journalist Peter Jennings gave news brief updates regarding the events happening overseas.

Box office performance of nominated films
At the time of the nominations announcement on February 11, the combined gross of the five Best Picture nominees at the US box office was $486 million, with an average of $97.3 million per film. The Lord of the Rings: The Two Towers was the highest earner among the Best Picture nominees with $321 million in domestic box office receipts. The film was followed by Gangs of New York ($70.1 million), Chicago ($64.5 million), The Hours ($21.8 million), and finally The Pianist ($9.1 million).

Of the top 50 grossing movies of the year, 47 nominations went to 14 films on the list. Only The Lord of the Rings: The Two Towers (2nd), My Big Fat Greek Wedding (5th), Ice Age (9th), Catch Me If You Can (11th), Lilo & Stitch (13th), Road to Perdition (23rd), Spirit: Stallion of the Cimarron (35th), Gangs of New York (37th), and Chicago (41st) were nominated for Best Picture, Best Animated Feature, or any of the directing, acting, or screenwriting awards. The other top 50 box office hits that earned nominations were Spider-Man (1st), Star Wars: Episode II: Attack of the Clones (3rd), Minority Report (16th), 8 Mile (22nd), and The Time Machine (44th).

Bowling for Columbine acceptance speech
Shortly after winning the Academy Award for Best Documentary Feature, Bowling for Columbine director Michael Moore spoke out against U.S. President George W. Bush and the Iraq War which had just started three days prior. He further criticized the president by stating, "We live in a time where we have fictitious election results that elects a fictitious president. We live in a time where we have a man sending us to war for fictitious reasons." The speech was received with a cacophony of boos, applause, and standing ovations from the audience at the theater. Moments after the speech concluded, in order to lighten the mood, host Martin joked, "The Teamsters are helping Michael Moore into the trunk of his limo."

Critical response
The show received a positive reception from most media publications. Television critic Robert Bianco of USA Today commended Martin's hosting performance writing that, "Luckily for viewers, Martin has two other qualities that are essential to a good Academy Awards host: wit and insider status. He used both to his and our advantage, winning the crowd's confidence and then gleefully mocking them all night." He also noted that the political remarks from presenters and speeches "a touch of tension to what is so often a dull evening." Pittsburgh Post-Gazette television columnist Rob Owen raved that "Martin radiates class and wit, something often lacking in awards show hosts. From jokes about the allegedly scaled-down ceremony to reaction to his return to the Oscar stage, Martin entertained consistently." He also quipped that even the segments honoring Oscar history "seemed tighter and less tedious." Tom Shales of The Washington Post gave high marks to Martin commenting, "Helping immeasurably to make it a great show was Steve Martin, who served as host for the second time and triumphed as a welcome sardonic voice amid all the usual piousness and self-adulation." He also commented that despite the toned-down atmosphere, the speeches and tributes provided several heartfelt and memorable moments desperately needed in uncertain times.

Some media outlets were more critical of the show. Television critic Ken Tucker of Entertainment Weekly bemoaned, "A wonderful, intelligent Oscar host two years ago, Martin on this night looked as though he'd thrown in the towel backstage and let comedy writer Bruce Vilanch come up with a batch of gormless ain't-Hollywood-goofy lines to absolve him of responsibility for being hilarious." Chicago Tribune columnist Steve Johnson lamented, "Martin in his second turn hosting Hollywood's big night was, especially in the early going, slightly off-key, his attempt to keep a jovial face on things understandable but eventually coming to seem a touch disrespectful." He went on to say, "Except for the Moore line, he simply was not able to perform a perhaps impossible task, putting people at ease about attending, or watching, a party as a war raged, visible to anyone who flipped over to CNN." David Zurawik of The Baltimore Sun quipped, "As the rest of the world saw televised images of captives and corpses identified as American soldiers, we watched host Steve Martin and a theater full of celebrities celebrating their self importance. Try as they might last night in the capital of Fantasy Land to create a program that would transport us beyond current events, they never came close." He also complained that many of the evening's comments and jokes seemed tone deaf and disrespectful in light of the war.

Ratings and reception
The American telecast on ABC drew in an average of 33.04 million people over its length, which was a 21% decrease from the previous year's ceremony. An estimated 62.55 million total viewers watched all or part of the awards. The show also earned lower Nielsen ratings compared to the previous ceremony with 20.58% of households watching over a 40.34 share. In addition, it garnered a lower 1849 demo rating with a 12.55 rating over a 35.37 share among viewers in that demographic. Many media outlets observed that cable news coverage of the Iraq War diverted home viewers' attention from the ceremony and therefore contributed to the lower ratings. At the time, it earned the lowest viewership for an Academy Award telecast since figures were compiled beginning with the 46th ceremony in 1974 and the lowest ratings for any broadcast since Nielsen Media Research kept track of such data since the 33rd ceremony in 1961.

In July 2003, the ceremony presentation received eight nominations at the 55th Primetime Emmys. Two months later, the ceremony won three of those nominations for Outstanding Art Direction For A Variety Or Music Program (Roy Christopher), Outstanding Lighting Direction (Electronic, Multi-camera) for a Variety, Music or Comedy Program (Robert Barnhart, Robert A. Dickinson, Andy O'Reilly), and Outstanding Music Direction (Bill Conti).

In Memoriam
The annual In Memoriam tribute, presented by actress Susan Sarandon, honored the following people.

Lew Wasserman – Executive
Richard Sylbert – Production designer
Eddie Bracken – Actor
George Sidney – Director
Katy Jurado – Actress
Jack Brodsky – Producer
Dudley Moore – Actor, comedian, musician
John Frankenheimer – Director
Rod Steiger – Actor
Norman Panama – Writer, director, producer
Horst Buchholz – Actor
J. L. Thompson – Director
Leo McKern – Actor
Kay Rose – Sound editor
Milton Berle – Comedian, actor
Ward Kimball – Animator
Margaret Booth – Editor
Signe Hasso – Actress
Daniel Taradash – Writer
Richard Crenna – Actor
Walter Scharf – Composer, conductor
Rosemary Clooney – Singer, actress
Charles Guggenheim – Documentarian
Kim Hunter – Actress
Adolph Green – Screenwriter, lyricist
Alberto Sordi – Actor
Marvin Mirisch – Executive
Conrad Hall – Cinematographer
George Roy Hill – Director
Richard Harris – Actor
James Coburn – Actor
Billy Wilder – Director

See also 

9th Screen Actors Guild Awards
23rd Golden Raspberry Awards
45th Grammy Awards
55th Primetime Emmy Awards
56th British Academy Film Awards
57th Tony Awards
27th Laurence Olivier Awards
60th Golden Globe Awards
List of submissions to the 75th Academy Awards for Best Foreign Language Film

References

Bibliography

External links
Official websites
Academy Awards Official website
The Academy of Motion Picture Arts and Sciences Official website
Oscar's Channel at YouTube (run by the Academy of Motion Picture Arts and Sciences)

Analysis
2002 Academy Awards Winners and History Filmsite
Academy Awards, USA: 2003 Internet Movie Database

News resources
Oscars 2003 BBC News
Academy Awards coverage CNN
Oscars: 2003 Academy Awards USA Today

Other resources

2002 film awards
2003 in American cinema
Academy Awards ceremonies
2003 in Los Angeles
Academy
Television shows directed by Louis J. Horvitz
March 2003 events in the United States